Pope Benedict IV (– 30 July 903) was the bishop of Rome and ruler of the Papal States from 1 February 900 to his death.  The tenth-century historian Flodoard, who nicknamed him "the Great", commended his noble birth and public generosity.

Benedict was a native of Rome, the son of one Mammalus, and was ordained priest by Pope Formosus. He succeeded Pope John IX. In 900, he excommunicated Count Baldwin II of Flanders for murdering Archbishop Fulk of Reims. In 901, Benedict crowned Louis the Blind as emperor. In 902, Berengar of Friuli defeated Louis III and forced him to leave Italy. Benedict died in Rome during the summer of 903; it is possible that Berengar had some involvement. Benedict was buried in front of St Peter's Basilica, by the gate of Guido. He was followed by Pope Leo V.

References

 This article incorporates text from the 1913 Catholic Encyclopedia article "Pope Benedict IV" by Horace K. Mann, a publication now in the public domain.

Literature

External links

Papa Benedikto IV katika Kamusi Elezo ya Kikatoliki
Encyclopædia Britannica
Opera Omnia by Migne Patrologia Latina with analytical indexes

Popes
Italian popes
840s births
903 deaths
Burials at St. Peter's Basilica
Year of birth unknown
10th-century popes